Shri Munjaba Temple is situated in Ukkadgaon, a small village situated in Shrigonda Taluka in Ahmednagar District in the state of Maharashtra, India. The village has a lake in its center, and its "Gramdaevat" is Munjaba (Mahadev-Shiv). The festival of the Shri Munjaba is celebrated by all the people every year. Usually this festival comes the day after Mahashivratri.

External links
Google maps

Ahmednagar district
Buildings and structures in Maharashtra
Hindu temples in Maharashtra